Prevotellaceae is a family of bacteria from the order Bacteroidales. As a member of the phylum Bacteroidota, its species are gram negative – meaning their outer cell wall contains lipopolysaccharides. Since they are anaerobes, members of Prevotellaceae can live in areas where there is little to no oxygen – such as the guts of mammals.

Prevotellaceae is split into 4 genera: Hallella, Paraprevotella, Prevotella, and Alloprevotella. These 4 genera include 51 different bacterial species.

The genus Prevotella is known for its role in the human gastrointestinal microbiota. Prevotella species are among the most numerous microbes culturable from the rumen and hind gut of cattle and sheep, where they help the breakdown of protein and carbohydrate foods. They are also present in humans, where they can be opportunistic pathogens. Prevotella, credited interchangeably with Bacteroides melaninogenicus, has been a problem for dentists' patients for years. As a human pathogen known for creating periodontal and tooth problems, Prevotella has long been studied to counteract its pathogenesis.

The presence of Prevotella in the human gastrointestinal tract is inversely correlated with Parkinson’s disease.

References

Bacteroidia